"Be Careful" is a song by American singer Sparkle from her 1998 debut album, Sparkle. The song reached number three on the US Billboard Rhythmic Hot 100 and number one on the Hot R&B/Hip-Hop Airplay Singles chart. Internationally, it reached number four in the Netherlands and number seven in the United Kingdom.

Background/music video
The video, directed by Kelly, also features Kelly who wrote, produced and composed this song. The single and the video were released before R. Kelly's single "When a Woman's Fed Up", which is the continuation of the story. Five weeks after the song was released it had already been played on the radio more than 40 million times in the US. Due to a Billboard rule, the song could not chart on the regular Billboard Hot 100 Singles Chart in America. The music video is directed by R. Kelly. The video shows an African American family that's struggling.

Track listing
European CD single
 "Be Careful" (LP version) – 5:16  	
 "Be Careful" (radio edit 1) – 5:18

Charts

Weekly charts

Year-end charts

Release history

References

1998 singles
1998 songs
Interscope Records singles
Jive Records singles
Song recordings produced by R. Kelly
Songs written by R. Kelly
UK Independent Singles Chart number-one singles